A mappa mundi (Latin ; plural = mappae mundi;) is any medieval European map of the world.

Around 1,100 mappae mundi are known to have survived from the Middle Ages. Of these, some 900 are found illustrating manuscript books and the remainder exist as stand-alone documents.

Types of mappae mundi

Extant mappae mundi come in several distinct varieties, including: 
 Zonal maps (sometimes called Macrobian maps)
 Tripartite maps (including "T-O" and "V-in-◻" maps)
 Quadripartite maps (including the Beatus maps)
 Complex maps
Medieval world maps which share some characteristics of traditional mappae mundi but contain elements from other sources, including Portolan charts and maps associated with Ptolemy's Geography are sometimes considered a fifth type, called "transitional mappae mundi".

Zonal maps
Zonal maps are pictures of the Eastern Hemisphere. Their purpose was to illustrate the concept that the world is a sphere with latitudinal climate zones, most often the five Aristotelian climes:  
 The northern frigid zone
 the northern temperate zone
 the equatorial tropical zone
 the southern temperate zone
 the southern frigid zone

Of these, only the two temperate zones at middle latitudes were believed to be inhabitable, and the known world was contained entirely within the northern temperate zone's Eastern Hemisphere. As most surviving zonal maps are found illustrating Macrobius' Commentary on Cicero's Dream of Scipio (an excerpt of Cicero's De Re Publica), this type of map is sometimes called "Macrobian".  In their simplest and most common form, Zonal mappae mundi are merely circles divided into five parallel zones, but several larger zonal maps with much more detail have survived.

Tripartite maps

T-O maps, unlike zonal maps, illustrate only the habitable portion of the world known to medieval Europeans, limiting their perspective to a relatively small portion of the Earth's Northern Hemisphere. The landmass was illustrated as a circle (an "O") divided into three portions by a "T".  These three divisions were the continents of Asia, Africa and Europe.  The popularity of the Macrobian maps and the combination of T-O style continents on some of the larger Macrobian spheres illustrate that Earth's sphericity continued to be understood among scholars during the Middle Ages.

The V-in-square map depicts the Earth divided between the sons of Noah.

Quadripartite or Beatus maps
Quadripartite maps represent a sort of amalgam of the zonal and T-O maps by illustrating the three known continents separated by an equatorial ocean from a fourth unknown land, often called Antipodes.  Fourteen large quadripartite maps are found illustrating different manuscripts of Beatus of Liébana's popular Commentary on the Apocalypse of St John.  These "Beatus maps" are believed to derive from a single (now lost) original which was used to illustrate the missions of the twelve apostles of Jesus Christ.

Complex maps
The "complex" or "great" world maps are the most famous mappae mundi. Although most employ a modified T-O scheme, they are considerably more detailed than their smaller T-O cousins. These maps show coastal details, mountains, rivers, cities, towns and provinces. Some include figures and stories from history, the Bible and classical mythology. Also shown on some maps are exotic plants, beasts and races known to medieval scholars only through Roman and Greek texts. Today that honour is held by the surviving centre portion of the Hereford map which is 147 cm across and 175 cm top to bottom. Other important maps in this group are the Cotton or Anglo-Saxon map, the Psalter map and the Henry of Mainz map. The somewhat later mappae mundi that accompany the popular Polychronicon of Ranulf Higden should probably be viewed as degenerate forms of the earlier complex maps.

Complex mappae mundi include:

Purpose of mappae mundi

To modern eyes, mappae mundi can look superficially primitive and inaccurate.  However, mappae mundi were never meant to be used as navigational charts and they make no pretence of showing the relative areas of land and water.  Rather, mappae mundi were schematic and were meant to illustrate different principles.  The simplest mappae mundi were diagrams meant to preserve and illustrate classical learning easily.  The zonal maps should be viewed as a kind of teaching aid—easily reproduced and designed to reinforce the idea of the Earth's sphericity and climate zones.  T-O maps were designed to schematically illustrate the three land masses of the world as it was known to the Romans and their medieval European heirs.

The larger mappae mundi have the space and detail to illustrate further concepts, such as the cardinal directions, distant lands, Bible stories, history, mythology, flora, fauna and exotic races.  In their fullest form, such as the Ebstorf and Hereford maps, they become minor encyclopedias of medieval knowledge.

In her study, Brigitte Englisch shows that the medieval world maps (the mappae mundi) both from their concept and in their concrete practice are founded on a systematically geometric projection of the known world. The basis of this projection, however, is not geographical surveying but the harmonious order of God’s creation. Using regular geometric forms like circles and triangles which are also regarded as religiously perfect, they created a coherent planispheric system. This quite basically presents the known world in its real geographic appearance which is visible in the so-called Vatican Map of Isidor (776), the world maps of Beatus of Liebana’s Commentary on the Apocalypse of St John (8th century), the Anglo-Saxon Map (ca. 1000), the Sawley map, the Psalter map, or the large mappae mundi of the 13th century (Hereford/Ebstorf).

End of the tradition
In the central Middle Ages a new type of map developed as an aid to navigating the Mediterranean Sea.  Known as "Portolan charts", these maps are characterized by extremely accurate coastlines with criss-crossing rhumb lines.  A particularly famous example is the Catalan Atlas attributed to Abraham Cresques in the Bibliothèque nationale de France.  During the late Middle Ages and with the coming of the Renaissance, western Europeans became reacquainted with the work of many ancient Greek scholars.  In the field of geography and map-making, the coordinate system which Claudius Ptolemy outlined in the Geography became extremely influential.  Over time maps influenced by these new ideas displaced the older traditions of mappae mundi.  The last examples of the tradition, including the massive map of Fra Mauro, may be seen as hybrids, incorporating Portolan-style coastlines into the frame of a traditional mappa mundi.

See also

Early world maps
Hereford Mappa Mundi
Virtual Mappa
Here be dragons
Terra incognita
Portolan chart

Notes

References

Further reading
 Peter Barber (ed.) (2005) The Map Book, London
 Anna-Dorothee von den Brincken (1992) Fines terrae: die Enden der Erde und der vierte Kontinent auf den mittelalterlichen Weltkarten  (MGH Schriften; 36). Hannover
 Crosby, Alfred W. (1996) The Measure of Reality: Quantification in Western Europe, 1250-1600. Cambridge: Cambridge University Press
 Evelyn Edson (1997) Mapping Time and Space: how medieval mapmakers viewed their world, London
 Brigitte Englisch (2002) Ordo orbis terrae: Die Weltsicht in den Mappae mundi des frühen und hohen Mittelalters, Berlin
 Conrad Rudolph, "'In Its Extraordinary Arrangement': Hugh of Saint Victor, the History of Salvation, and the World Map of The Mystic Ark," Restoration Through Contemplation: New Approaches to the Victorines, ed. Torsten Edstam and Robert Porwoll (2016)

External links 
Modern Medieval Map Myths: The Flat World, Ancient Sea-Kings, and Dragons
Detailed Fra Mauro Mappa Mundi 1459/60 at bottom of article
Ancient World Maps
 1452 Mappamundi by Giovanni Leardo held at the American Geographical Society Library, UW Milwaukee
Mappa Mundi Hereford Digital Mappa Mundi exploration
 More information and Mappa mundi images can be found at the Cornell University: Persuasive Cartography: The PJ Mode Collection
 Discussion by Janina Ramirez and Peter Frankopan: Art Detective Podcast, 22 Mar 2017
 Virtual Mappa: Digital Editions of Early Medieval Maps of the World, edit. Martin Foys, Heather Wacha, et al. (Philadelphia, PA: Schoenberg Institute of Manuscript Studies, 2018): https://sims2.digitalmappa.org/36. DOI: 10.21231/ef21-ev82.

Map types
Historic maps of the world